Zacher is a German surname. Notable people with the surname include:

Daniel Zacher (born 1988), German footballer
Elmer Zacher (1880–1944), American baseball player
Gábor Zacher (born 1960), Hungarian physician
Gerd Zacher (1929–2014), German composer, organist and writer
Hans F. Zacher (1928–2015), German academician
Heidi Zacher, German freestyle skier
Johann Michael Zächer (1649–1712), Austrian composer
Julius Zacher (1816–1887), German philologist
Rolf Zacher (born 1941), German actor

German-language surnames
Surnames from given names